Benilde-St. Margaret's is a Catholic, co-educational private prep school for grades 7–12 located in St. Louis Park, Minnesota, that draws its over one thousand students from throughout the Twin Cities Metro Area.  It is located in the Roman Catholic Archdiocese of Saint Paul and Minneapolis.

History
It is named after Saint Bénilde Romançon and Saint Margaret of Scotland. Benilde-St. Margaret's was originally a secondary school formed by a merger in 1974 between St. Margaret's Academy, a Catholic secondary school for girls in Minneapolis, and Benilde High School, a Catholic secondary school for boys in St. Louis Park.  Its present building was originally that of Benilde High School.

St. Margaret's Academy
St. Margaret's was founded by the Sisters of St. Joseph of Carondelet in 1907 as St. Margaret's Academy. The campus for this all-girls school was located near the Basilica of St. Mary in downtown Minneapolis and included two mansions and a carriage house that had been built in the 1880s.  By 1959 the old school had become inadequate in size – for every 100 girls accepted, about 200 were turned away. The Sisters of St. Joseph, who had anticipated such a problem, had purchased twenty-eight acres, and by 1960 a new school was built on Upton Avenue, near the Eloise Butler Wildflower Gardens and Wirth Park.

Benilde High School
The Brothers of the Christian Schools (informally known as the Christian Brothers), under the direction of Brother Mark Sullivan, built a boys' school in the Minneapolis suburb of St. Louis Park in 1956 because De La Salle (the first all-boys Catholic high school in the west metro) was full.

Merger
Both schools operated independently until the 1970s, at which time enrollment began to decline and costs began to escalate.  In 1974, the St. Margaret's facility was sold to the Minneapolis school system, and the merged Benilde-St. Margaret's School opened its door at the former Benilde High School site. One hundred ninety students graduated in its first class.

The school has undergone two major additions since the merger; a new gym in 1986, along with a new chapel, theatre, arts center, and classroom wing in 2001.

The mascot is a Knight, named Victor E Knight who attends school events and leads students in singing the school rouser and cheering on student athletes.

Academics 
In 1989, a junior high was added, and one hundred seventh- and eighth-graders were enrolled in the first year. Students receive laptops to do their work over the school year. As a "school within a school," the junior high exists to help seventh and eighth-grade students develop their potential and make a successful transition from elementary to high school. The junior faculty and staff foster decision-making and responsibility in a nurturing atmosphere and they provide a variety of spiritual, academic, and extracurricular opportunities for student involvement. The Junior High is in the same building as the high school.

Activities
The school competes in the Metro West Conference in the Minnesota State High School League. The school's newspaper is the Knight Errant. The Knight Errant has won several awards and the website, bsmknighterrant.org, in 2009 received one of seven National Pace Maker Awards for progressive journalism. Speech is also quite popular, with 100 students participating in the season of 2009–2010.

Notable alumni

Andrew Alberts, NHL Vancouver Canucks
Mark T. Vande Hei, A NASA Astronaut
Devean George, NBA Los Angeles Lakers.
Sean Lumpkin, NFL New Orleans Saints.
Larry Mikan, basketball player for NCAA DI Minnesota Golden Gophers, and NBA Cleveland Cavaliers
Father H. Timothy ("Tim") Vakoc – the first U.S. military chaplain to die from wounds received in the Iraq War.
Jordan Taylor, NCAA  University of Wisconsin-Madison 2008 Mr. Basketball award winner. Led the Badgers to the Sweet 16 in 2011 March Madness and 2012 March Madness
Michael Fabiano, professional opera singer
David Carr, journalist
Erik Madigan Heck, photographer, founding editor of Nomenus Quarterly
Grant Besse (2013) - Wisconsin Badgers men's ice hockey, 2013 Mr Hockey Award, drafted by the Anaheim Ducks
Will Steger (1962), Polar Explorer, Author
Kelly Pannek (2014), NCAA Minnesota Golden Gophers women's ice hockey, United States women's national ice hockey team, 2018 Olympic gold medalist
Hilda Simms, African American actress and activist
Julia Duffy, Emmy nominated actress

References

External links
Benilde-St. Margaret's Official Website

Roman Catholic Archdiocese of Saint Paul and Minneapolis
Catholic secondary schools in Minnesota
Lasallian schools in the United States
Private middle schools in Minnesota
Educational institutions established in 1907
Educational institutions established in 1974
Schools in Hennepin County, Minnesota
1907 establishments in Minnesota